Patrick Helmes (born 1 March 1984) is a German former professional footballer who played as a striker. He is currently working as the manager of Sportfreunde Siegen. Helmes retired from professional football at the age of 31.

Club career

Early career
As a youth player, Helmes was active in local clubs in Freudenberg, Westphalia and Siegen. He joined 1. FC Köln in 1997, at the age of 13. However, he was regarded as too unstable and sent away in 2000. He subsequently went back to Sportfreunde Siegen, where he had already spent some time as a youth player. In the 2004–05 season, he scored 21 goals for his team in the third division, which made him top scorer of the league, helping his team to promotion to the second division.

1. FC Köln
He then joined his old club Köln again, where he made his Bundesliga debut in 2005 and scored his first goal in his second match, against rivals Bayer Leverkusen. After his club was relegated to the second division, Helmes became one of the most important players for his side, scoring seven times in his first five games of the season and keeping Köln at the top of the table. However, he scored the last of those goals with a broken foot. The injury kept him out of the squad for the following four months, during which his team performed extremely poorly and lost all chances to return to the first division.

Helmes did not hide his intention of joining another team. Even though he confirmed that his departure to Bayer Leverkusen would follow the 2007–08 season, Köln coach Christoph Daum still named him captain of the squad in the summer of 2007. He was later replaced as captain, but nevertheless had a good second half of the season, for which kicker sportsmagazine named him best striker of Germany's second division, ahead of Oliver Neuville, Chinedu Obasi and Demba Ba.

Bayer Leverkusen
At Leverkusen, Helmes had a good start in the 2008–09 season, despite his injury in June which caused him being out of action for three weeks. Forming a duo with Stefan Kießling, he scored six goals in the first five games of the season, among them a hat-trick against Hannover 96. Only months after signing until 2012, his contract was extended and was then valid until 2013. At the end of his first season at Leverkusen, Helmes had scored 21 goals in 34 league games, and three goals in six appearances in the DFB-Pokal where his team reached the final losing to Werder Bremen. Just about two weeks after the final, a cruciate ligament in Helmes' right knee tore while Helmes was playing football with friends, and he had to be operated. On 19 December 2010, he scored the second goal of the match to achieve a full-time draw against SC Freiburg.

VfL Wolfsburg
On 31 January 2011, Helmes moved to fellow Bundesliga side VfL Wolfsburg, the champion of 2008–09 for a reported fee of €8 million. He only made eight appearances for the club in his first half-season, facing competition by the club's top strikers Grafite and Mario Mandžukić.

The next season started out better for Helmes, who scored twice in the first game against former team Köln. However, those were his last goals of the first half of the season in which he made his final appearance on October, 1st. Helmes even got banned from the Bundesliga squad by manager Felix Magath and had to train with the reserves. He made his comeback appearance in the Bundesliga on 25 February 2012, instantly scoring against Hoffenheim. By the end of the season, he had scored nine more times.

In August 2012, Helmes tore his cruciate ligament in a friendly against Manchester City. His first appearance in the 2012–13 Bundesliga season was on 15 February 2013, against Bayern Munich.

International career
Helmes was selected for the national team for the first time by Joachim Löw. He made his international debut for Germany in a friendly against Denmark on 28 March 2007, being substituted for Jan Schlaudraff in 80th minute. He made two more short appearances afterwards, before he was selected for the starting squad for the first time on 12 September 2007 in a friendly against Romania held at RheinEnergieStadion in Cologne, in which he was joined by fellow Cologne local hero Lukas Podolski. He was included in Löw's 26 man provisional Euro 2008 squad but was eventually left out in favour of Oliver Neuville.

After the European Championships, he had a few more appearances as a substitute. Helmes scored his first goal for the national team on 19 November 2008 in a 1–2 friendly defeat against England. He scored his second goal for Germany almost two years later in a friendly against Denmark after coming on as a substitute.

Coaching career
After retiring in the summer 2015, Helmes became the new assistant manager of 1. FC Köln II. He became the interim head coach on 6 December 2016 and became the permanent head coach on 22 December 2016. His first match was 2–1 loss to Borussia Mönchengladbach II on 10 December 2016. 1. FC Köln took the interim tag off and was manager of 1. FC Köln II until 25 September 2017. His final match was a 6–0 loss to SV Rödinghausen. He then became assistant manager for Rot-Weiß Erfurt. On 13 July 2020, Helmes was hired for a dual role of assistant manager for Admira Wacker Mödling and manager of the reserve team. He was also the interim manager of Admira Wacker's first team between 14 September 2020 and 21 September 2020. He lost his only match as interim manager 5–0 to SKN St. Pölten.

In April 2021 it was announced that he would become the new manager of Alemannia Aachen on 1 July 2021. He was sacked on 26 October 2021 following a poor start to the season.

In January 2023, he returned to management when he signed a contract to become manager of Sportfreunde Siegen.

Personal life
Helmes' father is Uwe Helmes, a former professional football player who later managed Siegen, among others. As of 2008, he works as a scout for Leverkusen.

Career statistics

Club

International
Scores and results list Germany's goal tally first, score column indicates score after each Helmes goal.

Managerial record

Honours

Club
Bayer Leverkusen
 DFB-Pokal Runner-up: 2008–09

References

External links
 
 
 
 

1984 births
Living people
German footballers
Germany international footballers
Germany B international footballers
Association football forwards
Sportfreunde Siegen players
1. FC Köln players
Bayer 04 Leverkusen players
VfL Wolfsburg players
Germany under-21 international footballers
Bundesliga players
2. Bundesliga players
Footballers from Cologne
Alemannia Aachen managers
Sportfreunde Siegen managers
1. FC Köln non-playing staff
German football managers
German expatriate sportspeople in Austria